Handcross  is a village in the Mid Sussex District of West Sussex, England. At the 2011 Census the population fell within the civil parish of Slaugham.

Handcross has one public house, The Red Lion (High Street), which was refurbished in 2010 in contemporary style. It formerly had three, the other two being The Fountain (demolished in 2012 and replaced by housing) and The Royal Oak (closed in 2020). This is now due to re-open in 2023, Handcross also has a Social club.

Handcross Primary School, situated at the northern end of the village recently underwent extensive building works to increase capacity. Opposite the primary school is Handcross Park School, an independent prep school.

Handcross Hill
Handcross Hill is a stretch of the A23 road which runs past the village. This part of dual carriageway used to be notorious for accidents due to its being on a steep gradient, being surrounded by trees and containing a number of sharp bends, those being unsuitable for a road of its type.

On 12 July 1906, a bus crashed into a tree following a mechanical failure, killing 10 people and injuring 26 in the worst road crash in Sussex history.

The hill has proved to be dangerous enough to be widened and straightened by the Highways Agency and the cutting of the surrounding trees began overnight in mid-2011. The project was completed in late 2014.

References

External links

Villages in West Sussex
Mid Sussex District